Ceva is a town in Piedmont, Italy.

Ceva may also refer to:

Places
 Marquisate of Ceva, a former independent state in Italy centered on the town of Ceva
 Ceva railway station, a railway station in the Italian town of Ceva
 Monte Ceva, a hill of the Veneto, Italy
 12579 Ceva, an asteroid

People
 Francesco Adriano Ceva (1580–1655), Roman Catholic Cardinal from Savoy
 Giovanni Ceva (1647–1734), Italian mathematician
 Tommaso Ceva (1648–1737), Italian Jesuit and mathematician, brother of Giovanni

Other uses
 Battle of Ceva, a battle fought in 1796 near the Italian town of Ceva
 CEVA Logistics, a logistics company
 CEVA rail, a rail line in the Geneva area of Switzerland
 Ceva (semiconductor company), a semiconductor intellectual property company
 Ceva Santé Animale, an animal health company
 Ceva's theorem, a geometrical theorem incorrectly attributed to Giovanni Ceva

See also
 Castelnuovo di Ceva, a comune (municipality) in the Italian region of Piedmont
 Cevian
 Seva (disambiguation)